Coney Island Hospital is a public teaching hospital located in the Coney Island neighborhood of Brooklyn, New York City. It is owned by NYC Health + Hospitals, a public benefit corporation of the city. The hospital is home to FDNY-EMS Station 43, formerly NYC-EMS Station 31, and is a major clinical affiliate for clinical clerkship with the New York Institute of Technology College of Osteopathic Medicine.

The hospital's name was legally changed in 2015 to NYC Health + Hospitals/Coney Island, proclaiming a change
"from a hospital-centric corporation to a healthcare delivery system." The longer name was part of the parent body's shortening of its name from New York City Health and Hospital Corporation.

History
In 1875, Coney Island Hospital began as a first aid station on the oceanfront beach near West Third Street. Most cases were feet cut by broken bottles.
  
On May 12, 1902, a small wooden building, one and one half stories high, on Sea Breeze Avenue, was rented to serve as an emergency hospital during the summer months.  It was called the Sea Breeze Hospital but officially known as Reception Hospital, an annex of the Kings County Hospital.  It had 20 beds and facilities for emergency treatment.  Patients requiring more were taken to Kings County Hospital, about seven miles away, in a horse-drawn ambulance.
  
Rapid population growth in southern Brooklyn called for a large and permanent hospital. Construction of "the first part of the Hammett Pavillion, the yellow building facing Ocean Parkway," to build a 100-bed hospital, began in 1908, north of Coney Island Creek and east of Ocean Parkway. 

With the help of Robert W. Hebberd, Coney Island Hospital was dedicated on May 18, 1910, then a six-building complex. Hammett was enlarged 1926 to 1928, resulting in 300 beds and five more floors. Population growth continued and so in 1954 the two white brick towers that make up the current hospital were opened.

21st century
In Spring 2006, Coney Island Hospital opened a new inpatient bed tower.

By 2011, the hospital became the biggest employer in southern Brooklyn. Hurricane Irene resulted in the hospital's first full-scale evacuation, since the buildings are located in Flood Zone A. Coney Island Hospital was severely damaged in 2012 due to Hurricane Sandy. As a result, the hospital proposes to spend $738 million on renovations, including constructing a new 11-story tower. The new tower is under construction and the completion date was scheduled to be June 2020, but due to COVID-19, the due date is moved to 2022. The Ida G. Israel Community Health Center was renovated and reopened in 2015.

A ten floor structure is expected to be completed fall of 2022, at which time Hammett will be demolished to facilitate building a flood-resistant barrier. The new building will be named after Ruth Bader Ginsburg, and the hospital will be changed to South Brooklyn Health.

Services
The hospital has been recognized for clinical innovations in Primary Care, Adolescent Medicine, Nuclear Medicine and Emergency Services. Interpreter services are available 24/7 in over 130 languages, though changing demographics has resulted in challenges for staff.

At 371 beds, Coney Island Hospital is the major medical service provider in southern Brooklyn with over 15,000 discharges and over 255,000 outpatient visits. The hospital's emergency department was renovated after Hurricane Sandy and now handles nearly 90,000 annual visits. As part of the upcoming renovation, Coney Island Hospital is planned to downsize to 351 beds, but with single-patient rooms in the new building.

Controversy
The 2016 day-after-admission death of a patient who was treated as if emotionally disturbed and shackled to her bed was investigated and found to be due to mistreatment, resulting in "three of the facility’s top officials" leaving their positions and several others reduced in rank or taking early retirement. At the time, there had been reports the "scores of people had been hired at Coney Island Hospital without proper authorization".

See also
Robert W. Hebberd

References

External links
 
 Hospital profile from the New York State Department of Health
 Health Department Fines Coney Island Hospital $46,000 for Deficiencies in Sex Assault Case
 City Hospitals Agency Settles Suit Over Botched Blood Transfusion

Hospital buildings completed in 1910
Hospital buildings completed in 1954
Hospital buildings completed in 2006
Hospitals in Brooklyn
Teaching hospitals in New York City
Hospitals established in 1875
NYC Health + Hospitals
1875 establishments in New York (state)
Coney Island
Public hospitals in the United States